|- 
| colspan=6 style="text-align:left;" |

The 1988 Sun Belt Conference men's soccer season was the 12th season of men's soccer in the conference.

Teams

Regular season

Postseason

Sun Belt Tournament 
The tournament was held in Norfolk, Virginia.

All-Sun Belt awards and teams

See also 
 1988 NCAA Division I men's soccer season
 1988 Sun Belt Conference Men's Soccer Tournament
 1988 Sun Belt Conference women's soccer season

References 

 
1988 NCAA Division I men's soccer season